Batch cryptography is the area of cryptology where cryptographic protocols are studied and developed for doing cryptographic processes like encryption/decryption, key exchange, authentication, etc. in a batch way instead of one by one. The concept of batch cryptography was introduced by Amos Fiat in 1989.

References

Cryptography